Jacob is a common male given name and a less well-known surname. It is a cognate of James, derived from Late Latin Iacobus, from Greek  Iakobos, from Hebrew  (Yaʿaqōḇ), the name of the Hebrew patriarch, Jacob son of Isaac and Rebecca. The name comes either from the Hebrew root  ʿqb meaning "to follow, to be behind" but also "to supplant, circumvent, assail, overreach", or from the word for "heel",  ʿaqeb. It can also be taken to mean "may God protect."

In the narrative of Genesis, it refers to the circumstances of Jacob's birth when he held on to the heel of his older twin brother Esau (Genesis 25:26).
The name is etymologized (in a direct speech by the character Esau) in Genesis 27:36, adding the 
significance of Jacob having "supplanted" his elder brother by buying his birthright.

In a Christian context, Jacob – James in English form – is the name for several people in the New Testament: (1) the apostle James, son of Zebedee, (2) another apostle, James, son of Alphaeus, and (3) James the brother of Jesus (James the Just), who led the original Nazarene Community in Jerusalem. There are several Jacobs in the genealogy of Jesus.

Modern usage 
From 1999 through 2012, Jacob was the most popular baby name for boys in the United States.

Variants 
Afrikaans – Jakob, Jakobus, Jacobus
Albanian – Jakob, Jakov, Jakub, Jakup, Gjokë, Gjoka, Zhak
Arabic – Yaʿqūb, Yakub (يعقوب); see also Jacob in Islam
Aragonese – Chacobo, Chaime
Armenian – Յակոբ (classical Armenian and Western Armenian), Հակոբ (Eastern Armenian) (Hakob, Hagop)
Azerbaijani – Yaqub, Yaqubun, Ceykob
Basque – Jakobi, Jagoba
Belarusian – Якуб, Якаў (Jakub, Jakaŭ)
Bengali – জ্যাকব (Jyākob), ইয়াকুব (Iyakub)
Bosnian – Jakub (Jakup)
Breton – Jakob, Jakez
Bulgarian – Яков (Yakov)
Catalan – Jaume, Dídac
Cebuano – Hakob
Chichewa – Yakobo
Chinese – 雅各 (Yǎgè)
Cornish – Jago, Jammes, Jamma
Corsican – Ghjacumu
Croatian – Jakov, Jakob, Jakša
Czech – Jakub 
Danish – Jakob, Jep, Jeppe, Ib
Dutch – Jaak, Jaap, Jakob, Jacobus, Jacco, Jaco, Sjaak, Kobus
English – Jakob, Jack, Jake, Jay, Jaycob; see also James
Esperanto – Jakobo
Estonian – Jaak, Jaagup, Jakob
Ethiopia – Yacob, Yacob, Yakob
Faroese – Jákup, Jakku
Fijian – Jekope, Kope
Finnish – Jaakob, Jaakoppi, Jaakko
French – Jacques, Jack, Jacob, Jayme, Jaume, Jacqueline (fem.)
Frisian – Japik
Galician – Xacobe, Santiago, Iago, Xaime
Georgian – იაკობ (Iakob), კობა (Koba)
German – Jakob
Greek – Iákovos (Ιάκωβος), Iakóv (Ιακώβ), Yángos (Γιάγκος)
Gujarati – જેકબ (Jēkaba)
Haitian Creole – Jakòb
Hausa – Yakubu
Hawaiian – Iakopo
Hebrew –Ya'akov (יעקב), Koby, Ya'akova (female)
Hindi – याकूब (Yākūba)
Hmong – Yakhauj
Hungarian – Jakab, Jákob
Icelandic – Jakob, Jakop
Igbo – Jekọb
Indonesian – Yakobus (used mainly by Christians), Yakub (used mainly by Muslims)
Irish – Séamas, Séamus, Sésamo, Sesame, Shéamais, Iacób, Siacus
Italian – Giacomo, Iacopo, Jacopo, Giacobbe
Japanese – Yakobu (ヤコブ)
Javanese – Yakub
Kannada – ಜಾಕೋಬ್ (Jākōb)
Kazakh – Жақып (Zhaqyp, Zhakip)
Khmer – លោកយ៉ាកុប (lok yeakob)
Korean – Yagop (야곱)
Kyrgyz – Жакып (Dzhakyp)
Lao – ຢາໂຄບ (ya okhb)
Latin – Iacobus
Latvian – Jēkabs
Lithuanian – Jokūbas
Macedonian – Јаков
Malayalam – ചാക്കോ (Chacko), യാക്കോബ് (Yakob)
Maltese – Ġakbu, Ġakobb
Māori – Hakopa
Marathi – याकोब (Yākōba)
Malay – Akob, Yakub, Yaakub
Mongolian – Иаков (Iakov)
Montenegrin – Jakov, Jakša 
Myanmar – yarkote sai
Nepali – याकूबले (Yākūbalē)
Norwegian – Jakob
Pampangan – Hakub
Persian – Yaghub (یعقوب)
Polish – Jakub, Kuba, Jakubina and Żaklina 
Portuguese – Jacó, Iago, Tiago, Thiago, Diogo, Jácomo, Jaime
Punjabi – ਯਾਕੂਬ ਨੇ (Yākūba nē)
Romanian – Iacob, Iacov
Romansh: Giacun, Giachen
Russian – Иаков (Iakov) (archaic O.T. form), Яков (Yakov, Iakov), Яша (Yasha, Jascha) (diminutive)
Samoan – Iakopo
Scots – Hamish, Jamie
Scottish Gaelic – Seumas
Serbian – Jakov (Јаков), Jakša (Јакша)
Sesotho – Jakobo
Sinhala – ජාකොබ් (Jakob), යාකොබ් (Yakob) 
Slovak – Jakub (short form: Kubo)
Slovenian – Jakob [ja:kop], Jaka
Somali – Yacquub
Sorbian – Jakub
Spanish – Jacobo, Yago, Iago, Santiago, Tiago, Diego, Jaime
Swahili – Yakobo
Swedish – Jakob
Sylheti – য়াকুব (Yakub)
Syriac – ܝܥܩܘܒ (Yaʿqub), also (Yaqo, Yaqko)
Tagalog – Hakob
Tajik – Яъқуб (Ja'quʙ)
Tamil – யாக்கோபு (Yākkōpu)
Telugu – యాకోబు (Yākôbu)
Thai – เจคอบ Ce khxb, pronounced "Ja-khawb" 
Tigrinya – ያእቆብ, ያዕቆብ (Ya‘ik’obi)
Turkish – Yakup
Ukrainian – Yakiv (Яків)
Urdu – یعقوب (Ya'kub)
Uzbek – Yoqub, Yakob, Ya'qub
Vietnamese – Giacôbê, Giacóp
Welsh – Siam, Jac, Iago
Xitsonga – Yakobo
Yiddish – Yankev, Yankl, Yankel, Yankele
Yoruba – Jakọbù
Zulu – Jakobe

People with the name

 Patriarch Jacob of Alexandria (1803–1865), Greek Patriarch of Alexandria 1861–1865
 Saint Jakov, Archbishop of Serbs 1286–1292
 Saint Jacob of Alaska, missionary of the Orthodox Church
 Saint Jacob of Nisibis, Bishop of Nisibis
 Jacob (Book of Mormon prophet)

See also

Jacob (disambiguation)

References

Given names
Masculine given names
Hebrew masculine given names
English masculine given names
Irish masculine given names
Scottish masculine given names
Welsh masculine given names
German masculine given names
Dutch masculine given names
Swedish masculine given names
Danish masculine given names
Modern names of Hebrew origin